Sayat is a commune in the Puy-de-Dôme department in Auvergne in central France.

Geography 

Sayat is situated northwest of Clermont-Ferrand. The commune consists of the villages Sayat, Argnat and Le Mas d'Argnat.

Population

See also 
 Communes of the Puy-de-Dôme department

References

External links 

 Sayat website
 Genealogy link, lists villages

Communes of Puy-de-Dôme